Andrei Igoryevich Malyukov (6 January 1948 – 19 December 2021) was a Soviet and Russian film director, screenwriter and producer. He was a laureate of the Vasilyev Brothers State Prize of the RSFSR (1980) and People's Artist of the Russian Federation (2004).

Malyukov died of COVID-19 in Moscow on 19 December 2021, at the age of 73.

References

External links

1948 births
2021 deaths
People from Novosibirsk
Russian film directors
Russian film producers
20th-century Russian screenwriters
Male screenwriters
20th-century Russian male writers
Soviet film directors
Soviet film producers
Soviet screenwriters
Deaths from the COVID-19 pandemic in Russia